Arquilhue Airport ,  is an airstrip at Arquilhue, a village in the  Los Ríos Region of Chile.

The runway has an additional  of unpaved overrun on the east end.

There is mountainous terrain southwest through northwest of the airstrip, and rising terrain in other quadrants.

See also

Transport in Chile
List of airports in Chile

References

External links
OpenStreetMap - Arquilhue
OurAirports - Arquilhue
FallingRain - Arquilhue Airport

Airports in Los Ríos Region